Bogićević and Bogičević (Богичевић) are two related Serbian surnames, patronymics derived from Bogić, a diminutive of Bogoje. It may refer to:

Bogić Bogićević, Bosnian politician
Dušan Bogičević (born 1990), Serbian rower
Jadranko Bogičević (born 1983), Bosnian footballer
Nina Bogićević (born 1989), Serbian women's basketballer
Tijana Bogićević (born 1981), Serbian singer
Vladislav Bogićević (born 1950), Serbian footballer

Serbian surnames